Llallagua (in hispanicized spelling) or Llallawa (Aymara for a monstrous potato (like two potatoes) or animal, Quechua for the god of seed-time during the Inca period) is a town in the Potosí Department in Bolivia. It is the seat of the Llallagua Municipality, the third municipal section of the Rafael Bustillo Province.

Geography

Llallagua features a rare microclimate amidst the semi-arid tundras of Potosí and Oruro, due to its extreme elevation near 4000m. Semi-arid and with average temperatures in its warmest month sitting right on the 11 °C threshold, the city's climate straddles that of the subtropical highland climate  (Cwc, according to the Köppen climate classification), with subpolar oceanic characteristics and a cold semi-arid climate (BSk). Summers are cool and wet with daily highs rarely rising above 22 °C, while winters feature cooler days with much colder nights averaging −4 °C. These low temperatures are a result of the extreme precipitation deficit during the winter months with the resulting aridity leading to an increased diurnal temperature variation.

Gallery

References

 www.ine.gov.bo

External links 

Map of the Rafael Bustillo Province

Populated places in Potosí Department